Bereg Kamy is a rural locality (a village) in Kondratovskoye Rural Settlement, Permsky District, Perm Krai, Russia. The population was 80 as of 2010. There are 21 streets.

References 

Rural localities in Permsky District